Alive in Seattle is a live DVD and album released in 2003 by the American rock band Heart. It is a recording of their final concert in Seattle, during their "Summer of Love Tour" in summer 2002. The show included many of their greatest hits and some new songs. The soundtrack of the concert was released in a double-CD package.

Track listing

Personnel

Heart
 Ann Wilson – lead and backing vocals, acoustic guitar, autoharp, flute, ukulele
 Nancy Wilson – lead and backing vocals, lead and rhythm guitars, acoustic guitar, mandolin, ukulele
 Scott Olson – lead and rhythm guitars, acoustic guitar, lap steel, backing vocals
 Tom Kellock – keyboards
 Mike Inez – bass guitar
 Ben Smith – drums, percussion

References 

Heart (band) live albums
2003 live albums
Epic Records live albums
2003 video albums
Live video albums
Bertelsmann Music Group video albums